SPOP Sing! is a Chinese singing reality competition broadcast by Mediacorp Channel 8. Season 1 premiered on 9 August after the broadcast of National Day Parade and ended on the live finale on 4 November at Padang.

During the live finals, 18-year-old Singapore Polytechnic student Jarrell Huang (17 at the time of his audition) was announced the winner of SPOP Sing!, and 21-year-old LASALLE College of the Arts student Marcus Tay was declared as a runner-up.

Development
The show was first revealed to the public on 22 April 2018 during the broadcast of Star Awards 2018 with a teaser clip uploaded to Toggle, aimed to promote the Chinese culture, the music genre of mandopop and xinyao, and paying tribute to local singing talents of Singapore. This is also the first S-Pop themed competition in more than a decade, since SPOP Hurray! in 2008. The grand prize for winning SPOP Sing! is a cash prize of S$30,000, and the winner's own debut single, titled "逆风飞翔" (originally sung by Hsiao Huang-chi and composed by Peter Lee) released under a recording deal.

The show also revealed former Sing! China finalists Nathan Hartono and Joanna Dong, as well as songwriter Boon Hui Lu, to be appointed as the show's ambassadors, while Lee Teng, Bonnie Loo and YES 933 DJ Gao Meigui are appointed the hosts of the programme.

The show premiered on national TV with the prelude episode "Spop Sing! Prelude" on National Day 2018 at 9pm on Channel U. Apart from the top 20 contestants, judges and ambassadors, Jim Lim was revealed as the Music Director, and Serene Koong was revealed as the Vocal and Performance Mentor.

Auditions
The auditions were announced on 17 May 2018, along with a list of the 200 shortlisted mandopop/xinyao songs published on the Toggle website, which participants are required to sing one of the 200 songs during the audition. Auditions were held at nine different locations, which were either open to public (Open auditions) or held privately (Campus auditions). Similar to Campus SuperStar, auditions were open to students studying on a local institution with an age limit between 13 and 25 years old, and in a change to the former, Polytechnic and University students were also eligible to participate as well. Lee Teng did not appear after the Cineleisure open auditions onwards.

The auditions required singers to enter an egg-shaped karaoke booth to perform a song of their choice. Their performance was recorded under video surveillance, which would be reviewed by the panel of judges after the auditions.

Short episodes
Several short videos of audition highlights were uploaded on Toggle starting on 7 June 2018. Another short episode, Fun With SPOP Sing! was broadcast on Mediacorp Channel 8 on 5 June 2018 at 9.50pm, right after the finale of Babies On Board. A Toggle-exclusive six-episode spin-off of the show, All About SPOP, premiered on 27 July, featuring celebrities and composers sharing their knowledge on Mandopop/xinyao music genre.

Marketing
The Committee to Promote Chinese Language Learning (CPCLL), a committee which promote Mandarin Chinese to Singapore, was the supporting partner of the show. Ambassador Hartono was among the ambassadors of CPCLL since 2017. Other sponsors include Bonia, Huawei, KFC, Mitsubishi Electric, Win2 Crackers and Simmons.

Revealing of the Top 20 contestants
On 16 July, the judges have confirmed and the Top 20 contestants who would advance to the live shows were announced. The identities of the top 20 were revealed to public for the first time in a meet-and-greet session on 21 July at Cathay Cineleisure Orchard. The broadcast is streamed live on Channel 8's Facebook page.

SHINE Festival 
The Top 20 contestants appeared at Shine Festival at OCBC Square on 4 August, where they sang "无底洞", "幸福不难", "王妃" and "不为谁而作的歌" in groups.

Non-competition episodes
Three non-competition episodes were aired during the season. A half-hour episode titled Prelude (SPOP 乐飞扬) was broadcast on 9 August on Mediacorp Channel 8 and Channel U after the 2018 National Day Parade, and re-ran on 19 August after the 2018 National Day Rally. It featured interviews from singers, songwriters and producers in Singapore's music industry, as well as the competition's ambassadors, and provides a brief introduction to each of the 20 contestants. The music video for its theme song, "听我唱响", as well as the show's new title card, premiered during this episode.

Two more were aired before the semi-final and grand finals on 28 October and 3 November, respectively. A half-hour episode aired before the semi-final, titled The Final 10 (十强SING人), featured the ten contestants on their preparation leading up to the semi-finals. A two-hour special aired the day before the grand finals, which features a compilation of performances, was titled Non-Stop Music (歌曲马拉松). Unlike the regular episodes, Non-Stop Music was not available for catch-up.

Pop-up Store Promotion
A SPOP Sing! promotional pop-up store appeared on Bugis Junction on 29 and 30 September 2018 in promotion of the show. Hosts Lee Teng and Gao Meigui appeared on the 29th, and YES 933 DJs Henry Law and Hazelle Teo appeared on the 30th.

Semi-finalist Meet-and-Greet
A second pop-up store was held on orchardgateway on 27 October and the semi-finalists appeared in a meet-and-greet session. The semi-finalists also appeared in Ngee Ann Plaza for guest performances in the Mediacorp Subaru Car Challenge.

Grand Finals Pre-show Showcase
A non-telecast pre-show music showcase was held at the Padang on 4 November at 4.00pm and featured local musicians Derrick Hoh and Trouze, Kelvin Tan, Desmond Ng, AL4HA, Kelly Poon, StellaVee (Stella Seah and Vee), The Apex Project, and Elton Lee.

Contestants
After rounds of auditions, on 16 July, the judges selected and confirmed the final 20 finalists and revealed on 21 July. The 20 finalists, along with their Instagram handles, are as follows:

Key:

	

	

: All contestants' age reflected in the table are the ages at the time of their auditions until the Top 20 Reveal; a caret next to the age indicate singers turned one year older at the time before the prelude episode aired.

Live Shows
The series consist of seven episodes (five one-hour quarter-finals, one 2.5-hour semi-finals, and one three-hour live broadcast grand finals), with the first episode first aired on Toggle via Toggle-It-First service (with free viewing, and captions were not added until the actual broadcast) on 21 September and on Mediacorp Channel 8 on 24 September, and ending on 4 November for both Toggle and Mediacorp Channel 8. Episodes rerun on Sundays at 2.30pm the week after the episode broadcast. The quarter-finals were taped and pre-recorded at the open field near *SCAPE, the semi-final episode was taped inside Capitol Theatre, and the grand finals at the Padang.

In a competition format which was previously seen on the fourth season of Campus Superstar, it was mandatory for contestants to perform renditions of songs (mentored by Serene Koong and directed by Jim Lim, with performances accompanied by live band Black Sakura) performed or composed by homegrown talents for the entire competition, hence the theme of the competition.

In contrary to most reality competitions where it involve public voting, the judges and the audience itself will make the decision to eliminate contestants from the competition, while public voting would only be allowed to cast their votes when the competition is left with the final two contestants to decide on the winner. This format was previously seen on another Singaporean singing competition, the second season of The Final 1.

Color key:

Week 1: Quarter Finals 1
air-date: 21 September 2018 (Toggle); 24 September 2018 (Mediacorp Channel 8)

For the first four quarter-finals (复赛), five contestants compete each week to vie for a place in the semi-final (半决赛). Prerecorded performances of each contestant's performance aired, as did the judges' selection (五选二) of two contestants from each group to advance to the semi-final. The remaining three contestants who were not chosen by the judges were placed under the "elimination zone" (淘汰区) and were in risk of elimination. After the judges' decided on the first two contestants, the open field audience will then cast their votes via their remote device to save one contestant from the "elimination zone" (SPOP抢救SING人) and that contestant had to compete again in the wildcard round (翻身赛). A new competition element, "popular index" (人气指数), was introduced, which is the open field audience's evaluation for a contestant's performance, though this does not necessarily influence the outcome of the competition, as the judges themselves select which contestants were to advance and which contestants were to eliminate.

For all episodes, Billy Koh and Peter Lee were the first two judges, while the third judge was rotated in each quarter-final, with singer Joi Chua taking on the first and third quarter-finals, and Jimmy Ye on the second and fourth quarter-finals; both singers joined as judges on the wildcard round.

Week 2: Quarter Finals 2
air-date: 28 September 2018 (Toggle); 1 October 2018 (Mediacorp Channel 8)

Week 3: Quarter Finals 3
air-date: 5 October 2018 (Toggle); 8 October 2018 (Mediacorp Channel 8)

Week 4: Quarter Finals 4
air-date: 12 October 2018 (Toggle); 15 October 2018 (Mediacorp Channel 8)
At the end of the fourth quarter finals, it was announced that all judges agreed to bring back one further act whom they felt should not have been eliminated on the quarter-finals; the singer was later revealed to be Karena Yeo.

Week 5: Quarter Finals 5- Wildcard round
air-date: 19 October 2018 (Toggle); 22 October 2018 (Mediacorp Channel 8)
The five contestants who were recipients of the "audience's save" and "judge's save" from the first four weeks returned to the stage to perform for the wildcard round (dubbed as "Comeback round" in the captions). Like the previous quarter-finals, judges decide which two contestants advanced to the semi-finals. The "popular index" was discontinued from this round onward and was replaced with a scoring system, in which the top two scoring contestants advancing to the semi-finals, while the other three contestants were eliminated.

Week 6: Semi-Final
air-date: 25 October 2018 (Toggle); 28 October 2018 (Mediacorp Channel 8)
Ten contestants performed two songs in this semi-final, one with a group (The judge's top three acts, Marcus Tay, Daryl-Ann Jansen, and Jarrell Ng, did a schoolyard-style pick to assign two/three more contestants to form their group) and another with a solo (ten of 11 songs were assigned by production and contestant picked the song by racing first to "snatch" their Huawei smartphones; "她说" was the only song unselected).

After each performance, two different set of scores were shown; one after the group's/every two solo performance (which is a given score from one of the three judges), and another after all the contestants have performed (average of all the judges' scores), with the latter accounted to the overall score. After the first round scores are revealed, each judge then picked one contestant from each group to receive a bonus score for their individual performance as a group (indicated in an orange background). The first round has a 30% weightage towards the overall score (all the members for the group received identical set of scores), and the second round covered the remaining 70%. Only the scores for the top five contestants were revealed (with their contestant's smartphone displaying the show's logo); contestants with the three highest combined scores will directly advance to the grand finals, while the two remaining contestants will compete for the fourth and final finalist via the "audience's save".

Mediacorp host (who was also the host of another S-pop themed competition SPOP Hurray!) Quan Yi Fong was officially introduced as the fourth host of SPOP Sing!, and Joi Chua served as the episode's third judge. Before the start of the second round, group performances (see non-competition performances below) were made to pay tribute to the late-xinyao singer Dawn Gan, who died on 22 September 2018.

Week 7: Grand Final
air-date: 4 November 2018
Four finalists performed up to four songs in the live finale. Liang Wern Fook and Eric Moo were brought in as guest judges for the grand finals at the Padang (dubbed as "决战@Padang"). Unlike regular episodes, the grand final does not have captions (including the re-run), as it was a live broadcast.

Eliminations occur at the end of each round starting from round two, in which one contestant who received the lowest judge's score (scores are separate from each round) was eliminated. In round one, the contestant with the highest judge's score was exempt from performing (and immune from elimination in) round two. During the fourth and final round, online votes cast from the public (a 20-minute voting window which opened from 9.05pm) decide on which contestant will win SPOP Sing!.

Elimination chart
Color key:

Contestants' appearances on earlier talent shows
Charlene Chua and Fu Qiao Han both participated in the second season of tvN's K-Pop Star Hunt and were chosen as top 16 contestants in the Singapore leg; both singers were eliminated in the regional finals and did not advance to the final 16.
Jarrell Ng was a contestant on four shows prior to SPOP Sing!: in 2007, Ng won the singing competition segment on the inaugural season of The Sheng Siong Show. In 2009, he was among a child cast (who portrayed Huang Yixin) in the 2009 drama Together. In 2011, he participated on the first season of Chinese Million Star, where he finished in ninth place. In 2017, he appeared on the second season of Sound Of My Dream, but failed to receive mentorship from guest mentor Fish Leong.
Celine Wong was a contestant under team Gary Chaw in the first season of The Voice Jue Zhan Hao Sheng, where she was eliminated during the battle rounds.

Reception
SPOP Sing! had a viewership of more than 1.7 million throughout the season broadcast, which include 816,000 viewers watching from Toggle viewing service. The finals episode was met with critical reception as the live finale won the Star Awards for Best Variety Special during the 2019 Star Awards ceremony. 

A spin-off, SPOP Wave! was aired in 2021.

References

External links
 

2018 Singaporean television seasons